The following is the 1956–57 network television schedule for the three major English language commercial broadcast networks in the United States. The schedule covers primetime hours from September 1956 through March 1957. The schedule is followed by a list per network of returning series, new series, and series cancelled after the 1955–56 season.

The 1956–57 network television schedule continued the trend of the previous season, with two of the three major U.S. television networks (ABC and CBS) scheduling more and more westerns and adventure series during prime time. In addition to its current stable of Westerns, which included Cheyenne, The Lone Ranger, and The Life and Legend of Wyatt Earp, ABC scheduled two new Western TV series: Broken Arrow and The Adventures of Jim Bowie, while CBS added Dick Powell's Zane Grey Theatre to its line-up, which already included Gunsmoke and Sergeant Preston of the Yukon. Castleman and Podrazik (1984) called the rush to schedule Western series on network television during this era "a virtual stampede". 

CBS "inherited Sunday afternoon NFL contests from the defunct DuMont network in the fall of 1956". Accordingly, "the expansion into Sunday sports by CBS (and NBC) meant that the traditional afternoon 'egghead' slots for highbrow programming had to be broken up, pushing those shows into the few odd spots still open in the day, or eliminating them completely. This reflected the networks' shift in emphasis during the mid-1950s, slanting television much more toward broad-based popular entertainment. Increasingly, this meant television programming produced in Hollywood [...] In 1957, the amount of prime time programming originating on the West Coast jumped from 40% to 71%." 

NBC, behind CBS in the network Nielsen ratings, hired Robert Kintner to revamp NBC's schedule. According to Castleman and Podrazik (1982), NBC's plan was to launch a program which would compete directly with CBS's second most popular series, The Ed Sullivan Show, on Sunday, the most heavily viewed TV night: "Sullivan's show was popular enough to boost the ratings of the programs on both before and after his; as a result, CBS had a chain of hits to begin the evening." NBC's strategy was designed to weaken CBS's Sunday night line-up. NBC's new program, The Steve Allen Show, debuted in the summer to get a head start on the competition. Although the two programs enjoyed a fierce rivalry, Sullivan's program would remain wildly popular, finishing second among all TV programs in the ratings that year, while Allen's show missed the top 30. Beginning this season, NBC had at least one show in color for every day of the week.

New fall series are highlighted in bold, while shows ending their runs are highlighted in italics.

Each of the 30 highest-rated shows is listed with its rank and rating as determined by Nielsen Media Research.

 Yellow indicates the programs in the top 10 for the season.
 Cyan indicates the programs in the top 20 for the season.
 Magenta indicates the programs in the top 30 for the season.

Sunday 

Notes: On NBC, Hallmark Hall of Fame (Color) aired as a monthly series, 7:30–9 p.m.

On CBS, Air Power, narrated by Walter Cronkite, aired from 6:30 to 7:30 p.m. on November 11, 1956, and from 6:30 to 7:00 p.m. from November 18, 1956 to May 5, 1957.

Monday 

On NBC, Producers' Showcase (Color) aired as a monthly series, from 8–9:30 p.m. On CBS, in some areas, Douglas Edwards with the News aired at 6:45 p.m.

On March 18, 1957, the popular Western series Tales of Wells Fargo debuted, replacing Stanley Monday nights on NBC at 8:30 PM EST.

From July 1 to September 23, 1957, the summer series Richard Diamond, Private Detective, starring David Janssen, aired on CBS at 8:30-9 p.m. It returned for a second irregular season on the CBS Thursday schedule from January 2 to June 26, 1958.

Tuesday 

(*) Formerly You'll Never Get Rich

NOTE: On March 5, 1957, the suspense drama Panic! replaced Noah's Ark, a Jack Webb production, on the NBC schedule.

Wednesday 

Note: On CBS, Pick the Winner aired as an interim U.S. election coverage series in September and October from 7:30 to 8 p.m. It previously had aired in 1952.

Thursday 

Note: On ABC, Compass and Industries for America shared the 9:30–10:00 p.m. time slot from June to July 1957. Compass aired only in markets where the local affiliate did not choose to air local programming. Industries for America continued to air in the time slot until September 1957.

Friday 

Note: On CBS, Mr. Adams and Eve premiered on January 4, 1957.

Saturday 

Notes: On NBC, Saturday Color Carnival (Color) aired as a monthly series, 9:00–10:30 p.m. The 1957 version of the NBC summer series Encore Theatre consisted of reruns of episodes of Ford Theatre.

By network

ABC

Returning Series
The Adventures of Ozzie and Harriet
The Adventures of Rin Tin Tin
Break the Bank
Cheyenne
Compass
Crossroads
The Danny Thomas Show
Date with the Angels
Disneyland
Dollar a Second
Down You Go
Du Pont Theater
Ethel and Albert
Famous Film Festival
Focus
Ford Theatre
Industries for America
It's Polka Time
John Daly and the News
Kukla, Fran and Ollie
The Lawrence Welk Show
Lawrence Welk's Dodge Dancing Party
The Life and Legend of Wyatt Earp
Life Is Worth Living
The Lone Ranger
Masquerade Party
Navy Log (moved from CBS)
Omnibus (moved from CBS)
The Original Amateur Hour
Ozark Jubilee
Press Conference
Star Tonight
Stop the Music
Telephone Time (moved from CBS)
The Vise
The Voice of Firestone
The Wednesday Night Fights
Wire Service
You Asked For It

New Series
The Adventures of Jim Bowie
Air Time '57 *
The Big Beat *
The Billy Graham Crusade *
Bold Journey *
Broken Arrow
Circus Time
Conflict
Date with the Angels *
Deadline for Action
The Gale Storm Show
It's Polka Time *
Kukla, Fran and Ollie
Lawrence Welk's Top Tunes and New Talent
Open Hearing *
Press Conference
The Ray Anthony Show
Telephone Time *
Treasure Hunt
Wire Service *

Not returning from 1955–56:
The Big Picture
Casablanca
Chance of a Lifetime
Combat Sergeant
The Dotty Mack Show
Down You Go
Ethel and Albert
Famous Film Festival
General Electric Summer Originals
Grand Ole Opry
King's Row
Life Begins at Eighty
Medical Horizons
MGM Parade
Outside U.S.A.
Paris Precinct
Star Tonight
Stop the Music
Talent Varieties
Tomorrow's Careers
TV Reader's Digest
Warner Brothers Presents

CBS

Returning Series
The 20th Century Fox Hour
The $64,000 Challenge
The $64,000 Question
The Adventures of Robin Hood
Alfred Hitchcock Presents
Arthur Godfrey's Talent Scouts
Arthur Godfrey and His Friends
Beat the Clock
The Bob Cummings Show
Climax!
Crusader
December Bride
Do You Trust Your Wife?
The Ed Sullivan Show
The Garry Moore Show
General Electric Theatre
The George Burns and Gracie Allen Show
Gunsmoke
High Finance
I Love Lucy
I've Got a Secret
The Jack Benny Show
Joe and Mabel
Lassie
The Lineup
The Millionaire
My Friend Flicka
Person to Person
Pick the Winner
Private Secretary
The Red Skelton Show
Schlitz Playhouse
Sergeant Preston of the Yukon
Shower of Stars
Studio One
The United States Steel Hour
What's My Line?

New Series
The Brothers
The Buccaneers
Dick Powell's Zane Grey Theater
Dr. Christian
The Gale Storm Show
Giant Step *
The Herb Shriner Show
Hey, Jeannie!
The Jimmy Dean Show *
Mr. Adams and Eve *
Playhouse 90
Richard Diamond, Private Detective *
The Spike Jones Show *
The Vincent Lopez Show *
The West Point Story
You're On Your Own *

Not returning from 1955–56:
The Adventures of Champion
Beat the Clock
Brave Eagle
CBS Cartoon Theatre
Crusader
Damon Runyon Theater
Four Star Playhouse
The Gene Autry Show
Hollywood Summer Theater
The Honeymooners
It's Always Jan
The Johnny Carson Show
Mama 
Meet Millie
My Favorite Husband
Our Miss Brooks
Shower of Stars
Stage Show
Two for the Money
Wanted
You'll Never Get Rich

DuMont

New series
Ethel Barrymore Theatre

Not returning from 1955-56
At Ringside
Boxing from St. Nicholas Arena
Hollywood Preview
What's the Story

NBC

Returning Series
The Alcoa Hour
Armstrong Circle Theatre
The Big Story
The Big Surprise
Break the $250,000 Bank
Caesar's Hour
Coke Time with Eddie Fisher
Dollar a Second
Dragnet
Father Knows Best
The George Gobel Show
Gillette Cavalcade of Sports
The Golden Touch of Frankie Carle
Goodyear Television Playhouse
The Jane Wyman Show
The Julius LaRosa Show
The Kaiser Aluminum Hour
Kraft Television Theatre
The Life of Riley
The Loretta Young Show
Lux Video Theatre
Medic
National Bowling Championships
People Are Funny
The People’s Choice
The Perry Como Show
Producer's Showcase
Red Barber's Corner
Robert Montgomery Presents
This Is Your Life
Wide Wide World
You Bet Your Life
Your Hit Parade

New Series
The Adventures of Hiram Holiday
The Big Moment *
Blondie *
Caesar's Hour
Circus Boy
The Dinah Shore Chevy Show
Dollar a Second
The Ford Show
The George Sanders Mystery Theater *
The Huntley–Brinkley Report
It's a Great Life
The Jonathan Winters Show
The Joseph Cotten Show
The Kaiser Aluminum Hour
The Nat King Cole Show
Noah's Ark
Panic! *
Saturday Color Carnival *
Stanley
Tales of the 77th Bengal Lancers
Tales of Wells Fargo *
Twenty-One
The Web *
Wire Service *

Not returning from 1955–56:
Adventure Theater
The Best in Mystery
Big Town
Camel News Caravan
Dear Phoebe
Frontier
Hollywood Today
It's a Great Life
Justice
The Martha Raye Show
Max Liebman Presents
The Milton Berle Show
The NBC Comedy Hour
Screen Director's Playhouse
Star Stage
The Tony Martin Show
Truth or Consequences

Note: The * indicates that the program was introduced in midseason.

References

 McNeil, Alex. Total Television. Fourth edition. New York: Penguin Books. .
 Brooks, Tim & Marsh, Earle (1964). The Complete Directory to Prime Time Network TV Shows (3rd ed.). New York: Ballantine. .

United States primetime network television schedules
United States network television schedule
United States network television schedule